Sheung Wong Yi Au is a village in Tai Po Kau, Tai Po District, Hong Kong.

Administration
Sheung Wong Yi Au is a recognized village under the New Territories Small House Policy.

History
At the time of the 1911 census, the population of Wong Yi Au was 114. The number of males was 43.

See also
 Ha Wong Yi Au

References

External links
 Delineation of area of existing village Sheung Wong Yi Au (Tai Po) for election of resident representative (2019 to 2022)

Villages in Tai Po District, Hong Kong